Klaus Heinrich (23 September 1927 – 23 November 2020) was a German philosopher of religion.

Career
In 2002, he was awarded the Sigmund Freud Prize by the Deutsche Akademie für Sprache und Dichtung.

In 1948 he was a founding student member of the Free University of Berlin and from 1971 to 1995 he was a full professor for "Religious Studies on the Philosophy of Religion" at the Institute for Religious Studies. After training in psychoanalysis and studying law, philosophy, Protestant theology, sociology, art history and literary studies, first at the Friedrich-Wilhelms-Universität Unter den Linden in Berlin and then at the FU, he received his doctorate from the FU in 1952. In 1964 he completed his habilitation here .

Michael Stausberg, historian of the study of religion, says of him:

Awards 
Sigmund Freud Prize

References

Further reading 
See also Irion, U. “Religiosität ohne Religion. Rudolf Otto, Rudolf Bultmann, Klaus Heinrich, Mircea Eliade.” In Kemper, P., ed. Macht des Mythos—Ohnmacht der Vernunft? Frankfurt am Main: Fischer Taschenbuch, 1989. pp. 289–309. (Heinrich is discussed on pp. 298–302).

1927 births
2020 deaths
Philosophers of religion
20th-century German philosophers
21st-century German philosophers
German male writers